Rhonda L. Lenton is a Canadian academic administrator and professor. She is the 8th and current president and vice-chancellor of York University in Toronto, Canada, having succeeded Mamdouh Shoukri on 1 July 2017 for a five-year term. She previously served as Dean of Atkinson College and later as York's Vice President Academic and Provost. Prior to her role in academic administration, Lenton was a Professor of Sociology. During her research career, Lenton led randomized public telephone surveys of social issues such as Internet dating and sexual assaults in Canada.

Career

Research
Lenton completed her Ph.D in sociology at the University of Toronto in 1989. The title of her dissertation was Parental Discipline and Child Abuse. Before becoming an academic administrator, she published research on a range of topics related to family violence, feminism in academia, and online dating. Her work included a 1999 national telephone survey of randomly selected women, asking them about their experiences with sexual harassment and assault. She has also researched the impact that the inclusion of women's studies within academia has had on feminism, determining that it had made feminism more conservative. She also conducted randomized robocalls regarding Internet dating behaviours of the Canadian public in 2001. In 2018, Lenton began a study of how Jewish Canadians have reared their children and any experience they may have had with prejudice, conducted through surveys of up to eighty questions. As university Provost, Lenton supported male students in their requests to keep them away from female students due to their religious preferences.

York University president
Lenton's appointment as university president became effective on 1 July 2017. As the university's chief spokesperson during a divisive part-time faculty strike in 2015, during which time she was also on the university's negotiating committee, Lenton's anticipated presidential appointment generated widespread opposition from an alliance of university students and faculty members prior to its announcement.

In 2018, during her first year, a second strike occurred at the university under her leadership. An undergraduate student occupation of the University Senate took place in support of the strike. The sit-in lasted several months, during which the participants highlighted potential expense account spending issues from Lenton's term as Vice President Academic and President, in addition to various other tuition-oriented concerns.

On May 1, 2018 President Lenton and the Chair of the Board of Governors (BoG) both were admonished in an official letter sent by the Canadian Association of University Teachers (CAUT) for their concerted and repeated attempts to undermine academic self-governance at York University. At that time, there were several York University faculty councils and student associations that also carried non-confidence motions in the conduct and leadership of Lenton as president. On May 11, the union representing the full-time tenured faculty stated the strike had lasted more than two months due to Lenton and the board's desire to break the union.

Recognition
In 2015, the Women's Executive Network named her one of the 100 Most Powerful Women in Canada during her past role as Provost of York University.

References

Living people
Academic staff of York University
Canadian sociologists
Canadian women sociologists
Presidents of York University
University of Toronto alumni
Canadian academic administrators
1956 births